Stade de l'Aube is a multi-use stadium in Troyes, France.  It is currently used mostly for football matches, by Troyes AC. The stadium is able to hold 20,400 people  and was built in 1956.

In June 2013, the Stade de l'Aube is the first stadium to build its pitch using the AirFibr hybrid turf technology, developed by the French company Natural Grass.

References

l'Aube
ES Troyes AC
Sports venues in Aube
Buildings and structures in Troyes
Sports venues completed in 1925